Crooked Creek may refer to:

Streams

In Australia
 Crooked Creek (Clyde River), a tributary of the Clyde River in New South Wales
 Crooked Creek (Walsh River), a tributary of the Walsh River in Queensland

In the United States

 Crooked Creek (Alaska) a tributary of the Kasilof River in Kenai Peninsula Borough
 Crooked Creek (Allegheny River), a tributary of the Allegheny River in Pennsylvania
 Crooked Creek (Arkansas), a tributary of the White River
 Crooked Creek (Georgia), a tributary of the Chattahoochee River near Fulton and Gwinnett
 Crooked Creek (Illinois), a tributary of the Kaskaskia River in Illinois
 Crooked Creek (Indiana), a tributary of the Anderson River
 Crooked Creek (Northern Indiana), a tributary of the Kankakee River
 Crooked Creek (Iowa River tributary), a stream in Iowa
 Crooked Creek (Skunk River tributary), a main tributary of the Skunk River in Iowa
 Crooked Creek (Houston County, Minnesota)
 Crooked Creek (Mississippi River), a tributary of the Mississippi in Minnesota
 Crooked Creek (Bear Creek), a stream in Missouri
 Crooked Creek (Coon Creek), a stream in Missouri
 Crooked Creek (Meramec River), a stream in Missouri
 Crooked Creek (Muddy Creek), a stream in Missouri
 Crooked Creek (North Fork Salt River), a stream in Missouri
 Crooked Creek (Salt River), a stream in Missouri
 Crooked Creek (Wyaconda River), a stream in Missouri
 Crooked Creek (Third Fork), a stream in Missouri
 Crooked Creek (Headwaters Diversion Channel), a stream in Missouri
 Crooked Creek (Rocky River tributary), a stream in Union County, North Carolina
 Crooked Creek (Oregon), a tributary of the Owyhee River
 Crooked Creek (Tennessee), a tributary of the Little River in Blount County
 Crooked Creek (Tioga River), a tributary of the Tioga River in Pennsylvania
 Crooked Creek (Summit County, Utah)
 Crooked Creek (Guyandotte River), a stream in West Virginia

Communities
 Crooked Creek, Alaska, a census-designated place (CDP) in Bethel Census Area
 Crooked Creek, West Virginia, an unincorporated community in Logan County
 Crooked Creek, Alberta, an unincorporated community in Canada
 Crooked Creek, Ontario, a community in Canada

Other
 Crooked Creek crater, an impact crater in Crawford County, Missouri, USA
 Crooked Creek Formation, a geologic formation in Meade County, Kansas, USA

See also
 
 Crooked River (disambiguation)
 Crooked Creek Township (disambiguation)